Mercimek köftesi is a lentil based salad or meze found in Turkish cuisine.

Regional mercimek köftesi styles
South-central:
Gaziantep mercimek köftesi (or Malhıtalı/Maltıkalı Küfte in the regional Turkish dialect)
Osmaniye mercimek köftesi
Southeastern:
Diyarbakır Belluh 
Mardin Belloğ

See also
 List of salads
 Eetch 
 Tabbouleh
 Çiğ köfte

References

External links 

Salads
Turkish words and phrases
Turkish cuisine
Lentil dishes
Assyrian cuisine